Walt Whitman is a statue by Jo Davidson of which there are several castings.

Davidson began working on a depiction of Walt Whitman after entering a competition for one in 1925. Although that statue was never realized, Davidson continued to refine what he had started.

When working on the statue Davidson first made a life-sized clay nude, then had a special armature created that allowed him to independently move the arms and legs, allowing him to get the exact movement that he was seeking. Davidson stated, "Nothing in my statue of Walt Whitman could be static and finally, I got the rhythm I was after."

The statue was first exhibited at the New York Worlds Fair in 1939. Then, also in 1939 Averell Harriman (whom Davidson had already done a bust of) suggested to Davidson that the work be placed in the Bear Mountain State Park. Davidson inspected the site, found it acceptable and the statue was placed there. At the statue’s unveiling New York Park Commissioner Robert Moses quipped, "I am not sure if this is a statue of Walt Whitman by Jo Davidson or a statue of Jo Davidson by Walt Whitman."

Another casting of the statue was done in 1957, purchased by the Fairmount Park Art Association and placed at the intersection of Broad Street and Packer Avenue, near the approach to the Walt Whitman Bridge.

In popular culture
 Poet Louis Simpson published a poem entitled “Walt Whitman at Bear Mountain in which he announces, “Even the bronze looks alive”.
 The work can be observed in the upper right hand of the 70 Sculptors photograph taken at the 3rd Sculpture International exhibition in Philadelphia in 1949. Davidson can be found in the picture seated in the front row, second from the right.

See also
 List of public art in Philadelphia

References

Bibliography
 
 

1939 sculptures
1957 sculptures
Bronze sculptures in Pennsylvania
Landmarks in Philadelphia
Monuments and memorials in Philadelphia
Outdoor sculptures in Philadelphia
Sculptures of men in Pennsylvania
Statues in Pennsylvania
Sculptures of men in New York (state)
Statues of writers
Davidson